John Bartholomew (31 October 1858 – 25 September 1928) was an Australian politician. He was the Ministerialist member for Maryborough in the Legislative Assembly of Queensland from 1896 to 1902.

References

1858 births
1928 deaths
Members of the Queensland Legislative Assembly
Place of birth missing
Politicians from Glasgow
Scottish emigrants to colonial Australia
19th-century Australian politicians
20th-century Australian politicians
People from Maryborough, Queensland